Ferroics is the generic name given to the study of ferromagnets, ferroelectrics, and ferroelastics.

Overview
The basis of ferroics is to understand the large changes in physical characteristics that occur over a very narrow temperature range. Above this critical temperature, the crystal is in a nonferroic state and does not exhibit the physical characteristic of interest. Upon cooling the material down below  it undergoes a spontaneous phase transition. Such a phase transition typically results in only a small deviation from the nonferroic crystal structure, but in altering the shape of the unit cell the point symmetry of the material is reduced. This breaking of symmetry is physically what allows the formation of the ferroic phase. 

In ferroelectrics, upon lowering the temperature below , a spontaneous dipole moment is induced along an axis of the unit cell.  Although individual dipole moments can sometimes be small, the effect of  unit cells gives rise to an electric field that over the bulk substance that is not insignificant.  An important point about ferroelectrics is that they cannot exist in a centrosymmetric crystal.  A centrosymmetric crystal is one where a lattice point  can be mapped onto a lattice point .

Ferromagnets is a term that most people are familiar with, and, as with ferroelastics, the spontaneous magnetization of a ferromagnet can be attributed to a breaking of point symmetry in switching from the paramagnetic to the ferromagnetic phase.  In this case,  is normally known as the Curie Temperature.  

In ferroelastic crystals, in going from the nonferroic (or prototypic phase) to the ferroic phase, a spontaneous strain is induced.  An example of a ferroelastic phase transition is when the crystal structure spontaneously changes from a tetragonal structure (a square prism shape) to a monoclinic structure (a general parallelepiped).  Here the shapes of the unit cell before and after the phase transition are different, and hence a strain is induced within the bulk.  

In recent years a new class of ferroic materials has been attracting increased interest. These multiferroics exhibit more than one ferroic property simultaneously in a single phase.

See also
 Ferroelectricity
 Ferromagnetism
 Piezoelectricity
 Pyroelectricity
 Ferroelasticity
 Multiferroics

Condensed matter physics
Magnetic ordering
Phases of matter
Hysteresis